Harmstonia is a genus of flies in the family Dolichopodidae.

Species

Harmstonia acuta Robinson, 1975
Harmstonia attenuata Robinson, 1967
Harmstonia clavicauda Robinson, 1967
Harmstonia costaricensis Robinson, 1967
Harmstonia ichilo Robinson & Woodley, 2005
Harmstonia intricata Robinson, 1964
Harmstonia jamaicensis Robinson, 1975
Harmstonia megalopyga Robinson, 1967
Harmstonia obscura Robinson, 1967
Harmstonia ornata Robinson, 1967
Harmstonia pallida Robinson, 1967
Harmstonia panamensis Robinson, 1975
Harmstonia pectinicauda Robinson, 1964
Harmstonia pubescens Robinson, 1967
Harmstonia recta Robinson, 1967
Harmstonia setosa Robinson, 1967
Harmstonia simplex Robinson, 1967
Harmstonia wirthi Robinson, 1975

References 

Dolichopodidae genera
Enliniinae
Diptera of North America
Taxa named by Harold E. Robinson